The Museum of Arts and Sciences is the name for several museums:

 Museum of Arts and Sciences (Macon, Georgia) in Macon, Georgia
 Museum of Arts and Sciences (Daytona Beach) in Daytona Beach, Florida
 Bruce Museum of Arts and Science in Greenwich, Connecticut